Overbrook, Texas is a small neighborhood in Southeast Houston.

Overbrook Civic Club
The Overbrook Civic Club is a club that provides awareness about current events happening in Overbrook. The Overbrook Civic Club usually has meetings on Fridays at 7:00pm at Mount Carmel in the Garden Villas neighborhood. For more info, go to the Overbrook civic club website.

Population Increase
The Overbrook population usually increases by 500 every year.

Neighborhoods in Houston